Hong Kong East Cluster is one of the seven hospital clusters managed by Hospital Authority in Hong Kong. It consists of seven public hospitals and 12 general outpatient clinics to provide public healthcare services for the population of Eastern, Wan Chai and Islands Districts (except North Lantau). In mid-2012, the population was 825,400. The current Cluster chief executive is Dr. Luk Che-chung.

Services
Hong Kong East Cluster operates the following seven hospitals of various capabilities to provide a range of acute, convalescent, rehabilitation and infirmary in-patient and ambulatory care services to the public in the areas of Eastern, Wan Chai and Islands Districts (except North Lantau).

Cheshire Home, Chung Hom Kok
Pamela Youde Nethersole Eastern Hospital
Ruttonjee Hospital
St. John Hospital
Tang Shiu Kin Hospital
Tung Wah Eastern Hospital
Wong Chuk Hang Hospital

In March 2013, the cluster had 3,031 in-patient beds and 7,226 full-time equivalent staff.

References

External links

2001 establishments in Hong Kong
Hospital Authority